Anoka is a city in and the county seat of Anoka County, Minnesota, United States. Its population was 17,142 at the 2010 census. Anoka is the
"Halloween Capital of the World" because it hosted one of the first Halloween parades in 1920. It continues to celebrate the holiday each year with several parades. Anoka is a northern suburb of the Twin Cities. U.S. Highways 10 / 169 and State Highway 47 are three of Anoka's main routes, and it has a station on the Northstar Commuter Rail line to Minneapolis.

History
Colonizers first settled the site that is now Anoka in 1844. By the mid-1850s Anoka had a school, a store and a flour mill. In 1856, C. C. Andrews called it a "large and handsome village" and noted that pine logs were floated down the Rum River to sawmills there. The city was formally incorporated in 1878. The name Anoka was derived from two Indian words. The native Dakota used A-NO-KA-TAN-HAN, meaning "on both sides", or "from both sides", referring to its location on the banks of the Rum River. The native Ojibwa used ON-O-KAY, meaning "working waters".

Anoka has a strong claim to having provided the first Union Army volunteers during the Civil War, as noted by a small plaque at the corner of West Main Street and Park Street. Alexander Ramsey, Minnesota's governor in 1861, was in Washington, D.C. when Fort Sumter was fired upon. He immediately offered a regiment to the War Department, and telegraphed former governor Willis Gorman and Lieutenant Governor Ignatius L. Donnelly that morning. Gorman, attending a district court session in Anoka, received the note by messenger from St. Paul and called a court recess, asking for volunteers. Aaron Greenwald, who has an "island" named after him on Lake George, and five others stepped forward; Greenwald was the first to sign. He died on July 5, 1863, after sustaining a mortal wound as a member of the 1st Minnesota Regiment in defense against Pickett's Charge at the Battle of Gettysburg.

Geography
Anoka lies at the confluence of the Rum and Mississippi Rivers, approximately 20 miles (30 km) northwest of Minneapolis. Adjacent communities include Dayton, Ramsey, Andover, Coon Rapids, and Champlin. The USGS tracks the city by the ID 639396 and the coordinates of 
45°11′52″N, 093°23′14″W.

Demographics

2010 census
As of the census of 2010, there were 17,142 people, 7,060 households, and 4,202 families living in the city. The racial makeup of the city was 88.0% White, 4.7% African American, 1.0% Native American, 1.8% Asian, 1.6% from other races, and 3.0% from two or more races. Hispanic or Latino of any race were 4.2% of the population.

There were 7,060 households, of which 29.4% had children under the age of 18 living with them, 40.6% were married couples living together, 13.7% had a female householder with no husband present, 5.2% had a male householder with no wife present, and 40.5% were non-families. 32.2% of all households were made up of individuals, and 11.8% had someone living alone who was 65 years of age or older. The average household size was 2.34 and the average family size was 2.95.

The median age in the city was 37.6 years. 21.9% of residents were under the age of 18; 9.4% were between the ages of 18 and 24; 28.7% were from 25 to 44; 26.3% were from 45 to 64; and 13.7% were 65 years of age or older. The gender makeup of the city was 49.8% male and 50.2% female.

2000 census
At the 2000 census, there were 18,076 people, 7,262 households and 4,408 families living in the city. The racial makeup of the city was 86.1% White, 4.6% African American, 0.9% Native American, 1.7% Asian, 0.01% Pacific Islander, 0.02% from other races, and 2.5% from two or more races. Hispanic or Latino of any race were 4.2% of the population.

There were 7,262 households, of which 30.9% had children under the age of 18 living with them, 44.5% were married couples living together, 12.0% had a female householder with no husband present, and 39.3% were non-families. 31.9% of all households were made up of individuals, and 11.2% had someone living alone who was 65 years of age or older.  The average household size was 2.38 and the average family size was 3.03. Age was represented as: 24.6% under the age of 18, 11.1% from 18 to 24, 32.2% from 25 to 44, 20.5% from 45 to 64, and 11.6% who were 65 years of age or older. The median age was 34 years. For every 100 females, there were 99.2 males. For every 100 females age 18 and over, there were 97.1 males.

The median household income was $42,659 and the median family income was $55,311. Males had a median income of $37,930 versus $27,753 for females. The per capita income for the city was $21,367. About 4.7% of families and 6.8% of the population were below the poverty line, including 9.2% of those under age 18 and 5.4% of those age 65 or over.

Economy

Top employers
According to Anoka's 2010 Comprehensive Annual Financial Report, its top employers were:

Museums and other points of interest
 Anoka County Historical Society
 Anoka Metro Regional Treatment Center
 Anoka County Library
 Goodrich Field
 Peninsula Point Two Rivers Historical Park
 Anoka–Champlin Mississippi River Bridge
 Windego Park Auditorium/Open Air Theater
 Anoka Nature Preserve
 Greenhaven Golf Course
 Anoka Aquatic Center
 Colonial Hall and Masonic Lodge No. 30
 Lyric Arts Theater

Government
In 2000, Anoka elected 22-year-old Bjorn Skogquist as mayor. He was reelected in 2002, 2004 and 2006. Skogquist was the second-youngest mayor ever elected in Minnesota (one year older than John Gibeau, who was elected mayor of Ceylon in 1998). He worked for open government, code reform, protection of historic housing and open space and encouraged young people to become involved in civics.

Education
Higher education institutions in Anoka include Anoka Technical College. One of the two main Anoka-Ramsey Community College campuses is in neighboring Coon Rapids.

Most Anoka elementary and secondary students attend schools in Anoka-Hennepin School District 11. District 11 secondary schools in Anoka are Anoka High School and Secondary Technical Education Program or S.T.E.P. High School.  The Middle School is Anoka Middle School for the Arts, formerly known as Fred Moore Middle School for the Performing Arts. Anoka Middle School for the Arts has two campuses: Fred Moore Campus (formerly Fred Moore Middle School for the Performing Arts), and Washington Campus (formerly Washington Elementary School). The District 11 elementary schools in Anoka are Franklin Elementary School, Lincoln Elementary School, and Wilson Elementary School. District 11 is the largest school district in the state of Minnesota and includes parts of twelve other municipalities besides Anoka. Some students attend public schools in other school districts chosen by their families under Minnesota's open enrollment statute, or students come from places such as Brooklyn Park under the NWISD Magnet Program.

Anoka has several private schools for all ages, including St. Stephens Catholic School.

Infrastructure

Transportation
U.S. Highways 10 / 169 and State Highway 47 are three of Anoka's main routes, and it has a station on the Northstar Commuter Rail line to Minneapolis, which opened in 2009.

Notable people
Flora Aldrich, physician and writer
Stub Allison, American college football coach
Dale Arnold, sportscaster, co-host of the WEEI-FM Dale & Holley (with Keefe) Show and the Boston Bruins pre- and postgame shows on NESN, resided in Anoka
Michele Bachmann, U.S. Representative from Minnesota's 6th District, was raised in Anoka and graduated from Anoka High School in 1974
Gretchen Carlson, former Fox News Channel anchor, 1989's Miss America, and celebrity spokesperson for March of Dimes
Larry Constantine, computer software pioneer and author, was raised in Anoka and graduated from Anoka High School in 1961
Jake Deitchler, Olympic wrestler, graduated from Anoka High School in 2008
Herbert Funk Goodrich, a former judge on the United States Court of Appeals for the Third Circuit, was born in Anoka
Anna Arnold Hedgeman, first African American to earn a B.A. from Hamline University and the first African American woman to hold a mayoral cabinet position in the history of New York.
Garrison Keillor, radio host of A Prairie Home Companion and author, born in Anoka and graduated from Anoka High School
Ernest A. Larsen, Minnesota state legislator and educator
Tom Mangan, Minnesota state legislator and educator
Steve Nelson, son of Anoka High School head football coach Stan Nelson, linebacker for the New England Patriots in the late 1970s
Brandon Paulson, U.S. Olympic wrestler, 1996 silver medalist, graduated from Anoka High School in 1992
Briana Scurry, United States women's national soccer team goalie, graduated from Anoka High School in 1990
Sean Sherk, former UFC lightweight champion
Richard K. Sorenson, master sergeant, USMC, was awarded the Medal of Honor for his heroism in the Marshall Islands of the South Pacific in February 1944 Rick Sorenson Park in downtown Anoka is named for him.
Matt Sorteberg (born 1986), professional ice hockey defenceman 
Robert Stewart Sparks, Los Angeles, California, city council member, 1925–27
Joe Tanner, Brooklyn Park, (born 1959), comedian and dementia activist
Bill Tuttle, major league baseball player of the 1950s and 1960s
Dick Wildung, player for the Green Bay Packers

See also
Anoka–Champlin Mississippi River Bridge
Federal Cartridge

References

External links

Anoka official city website

Cities in Anoka County, Minnesota
Cities in Minnesota
Minnesota populated places on the Mississippi River
County seats in Minnesota
Populated places established in 1844
1844 establishments in the United States